Trinity Episcopal Church is a parish church in the Episcopal Diocese of Iowa. The church is located in Iowa City, Iowa, United States. It was individually listed on the National Register of Historic Places in 1974. In 2021, the building was included as a contributing property in the Iowa City Downtown Historic District.

History
Trinity Church traces its roots to the missionary activities of the Rt. Rev. Jackson Kemper, Missionary Bishop of the Northwest, who first visited the area on July 10, 1841. He continued his visits until the parish was formed on August 7, 1853. The first rector of the church, the Rev. Willis H. Barris, came to Trinity on October 15, 1855. The Rev. Silas Totten who was rector from 1859 to 1862 served as the second President of the University of Iowa at the same time. The parish had no regular meeting place until 1862 when it purchased the Athenaeum. That building was used for church purposes until the present church was completed on October 1, 1871. The Athenaeum building was later sold to St. Patrick's Catholic Church when it was established in 1873.

The present church building was built on property purchased from Samuel and Sarah Ballard in 1868. The design for the church is attributed to Richard Upjohn. It is not known if the plans came directly from Upjohn, or if they were from drawings found in his Rural Architecture. There is also some evidence that it resembles a drawing by Bishop Randall of Colorado that was published in The Spirit of Missions in May 1867. The church is a wood structure in the Gothic Revival style. It is considered significant as the only Gothic Revival building in Iowa City that utilizes vertical boarding that is often used in this form of the style. While the sanctuary remains similar to the day it was built, additions for educational facilities and a parish hall have been added over the years.

References

External links

Trinity’s Web Site

1853 establishments in Iowa
Religious organizations established in 1853
Churches completed in 1871
19th-century Episcopal church buildings
Carpenter Gothic church buildings in Iowa
Episcopal church buildings in Iowa
Churches in Iowa City, Iowa
Churches on the National Register of Historic Places in Iowa
National Register of Historic Places in Iowa City, Iowa
Individually listed contributing properties to historic districts on the National Register in Iowa